Narneh (also Romanized as Nārneh) is a village in Eshkevar Rural District, in the Central District of Ramsar County, Mazandaran Province, Iran. At the 2006 census, its population was 114, in 25 families.

References 

Populated places in Ramsar County